CCAI is an acronym that can refer to:
Climate Change Artificial Intelligence, an initiative of data scientists to help resolve the ongoing issue of climate change
Calculated Carbon Aromaticity Index, an index to calculate the ignition quality of residual fuel oil
Congressional Coalition on Adoption, an American organization supporting children in need of a family
Consumer Confidence Average Index, an indicator of American consumers confidence
Computer Controlled Acoustic Instruments pt2, an album from Aphex Twin.